In Search of a Midnight Kiss is a 2007 American independent romantic comedy film written and directed by Alex Holdridge. It was listed on the National Board of Review's Top 10 Independent Films of 2008, won the Independent Spirit John Cassavetes Award in 2009 as well as having earned awards at festivals around the world.

It premiered at the Tribeca Film Festival in 2007 and since has played at festivals around the world from Mill Valley, Chicago and Los Angeles in the U.S. to Raindance (London), Edinburgh, Sarajevo, Istanbul, Bangkok, Kraków, Thessaloniki and Melbourne outside the States. It has been released in theaters in the UK (Vertigo Films), the U.S. (IFC Films), Spain (Sherlock), Poland (Vivarto) and Greece (Seven Films). It was released  in Australia on February 14, 2009.

Plot
Wilson (Scoot McNairy), a 29-year-old man who has just endured the most miserable year of his life, newly arrived in the City of Angels, is alone and penniless as New Year's Eve approaches. He vows to lock his doors, pull his blinds, and climb into bed – until best friend Jacob (Brian McGuire) talks him into posting a Craigslist personal ad. In seemingly no time at all Vivian (Sara Simmonds) responds, determined to be with the "right" man at the stroke of midnight.

Critical reception
As of October 11, 2008, the review aggregator Rotten Tomatoes reported that 85% of critics rated the film positively based on 48 reviews, with the consensus that "Funny, quirky, and bittersweet, In Search of a Midnight Kiss is a romantic comedy with a heart and a brain -- and stands as a sharp debut for director Alex Holdridge." Metacritic reported the film had an average score of 64 out of 100 based on 25 reviews, indicating a generally favorable response.

The film appeared on some critics' top ten lists of the best films of 2008. Kimberly Jones of The Austin Chronicle named it the 9th best film of 2008, and Stephen Farber of The Hollywood Reporter named it the 10th best film of 2008.

Awards and nominations
Winner, 2009 Independent Spirit Award: John Cassavetes Award.
National Board of Review - Top 10 Independent Film 2008
Winner Florida Film Festival, 2008
Winner Best Editing Woodstock Film Festival, 2007
Winner Best Feature Film - Florida Film Festival 2007
Winner, Best of Fest Edinburgh Film Festival 2007
Winner, Nobel Bank Critic's Award Best Feature - Kraków's OFF Camera Film Festival 2008

References

External links
 
 
 
 Time Out Review
 The Times Review
 The Scotsman Review
 Review at View London
 Observer Rave Review
 The Times - "How In Search of a Midnight Kiss" became a love letter to L.A.
 The Scotsman - A Fond Kiss - Interview with Alex Holdridge

2007 films
2007 independent films
2007 romantic comedy films
American black-and-white films
American independent films
American romantic comedy films
Films directed by Alex Holdridge
Films set in Los Angeles
Films set around New Year
Vertigo Films films
2000s English-language films
2000s American films
John Cassavetes Award winners